is a junior college in Nagasaki, Japan, and is part of the Nagasaki University network. The institute was founded in 1951 and abolished in 2000.

Educational institutions established in 1951
Japanese junior colleges
Educational institutions disestablished in 2000
Universities and colleges in Nagasaki Prefecture
1951 establishments in Japan